Monte Saccarello (Italian) or Mont Saccarel (French) is a mountain located on the French-Italian border between Liguria, Piedmont and Provence-Alpes-Côte d'Azur.

History 
The mountain up to World War II was totally belonging to Italy but, following the Paris Peace Treaties, signed in February 1947, is now shared between Italy and France.

Geography 
 
The mountain belongs to the Ligurian Alps;  located on the main chain of the Alps, is the maximum elevation in the Italian region of Liguria.

On a sub-peak of the mountain stands a large bronze statue of Jesus Christ built in 1901.

From its north-eastern slopes rises the Tanaro.

SOIUSA classification 
According to the SOIUSA (International Standardized Mountain Subdivision of the Alps) the mountain can be classified in the following way:
 main part = Western Alps
 major sector =  South Western Alps
 section = Ligurian Alps
 subsection = Alpi del Marguareis
 supergroup = Catena del Saccarello
 group = Gruppo del Monte Saccarello
 subgroup = Nodo del Monte Saccarello
 code = I/A-1.II-A.1.a

Environment 
The eastern side of the mountain is gentle and grassy while the western one is a rocky and very steep.

Hiking 
The mountain is accessible by mountain paths and is reached by the Alta Via dei Monti Liguri, a long-distance trail from Ventimiglia (province of Imperia) to Bolano (province of La Spezia).

Mountain huts 
 Rifugio Sanremo (2,054 m)

Conservation 
The Ligurian side of the mountain since 2007 is included in the Parco naturale regionale delle Alpi Liguri.

See also

 List of Italian regions by highest point
 Monte Tanarello
 France–Italy border

References

Mountains of the Ligurian Alps
Mountains of Liguria
Mountains of Piedmont
Mountains of Alpes-Maritimes
Two-thousanders of France
France–Italy border
International mountains of Europe
Two-thousanders of Italy
Highest points of Italian regions
Mountains partially in France